Norman Karol Gottwald (October 27, 1926 – March 11, 2022) was a 20th-century American Marxist, political activist, and Old Testament scholar who pioneered the use of social theory and method in biblical studies.

Education
Gottwald received an A.B. and Th.B. from Eastern Baptist Theological Seminary (1949), an M.Div. from Union Theological Seminary (1951), and a doctorate in biblical literature from Columbia University (1953).

Academic career
Gottwald taught at several renowned institutions over the course of his career, including Columbia University (1953-1955), the Andover Newton Theological School (1955-1965) and the Berkeley Baptist Divinity School (later American Baptist Seminary of the West) from 1965 to 1973. From 1966 to 1982, he taught at the Graduate Theological Union. From 1980 to 1994, he taught at the New York Theological Seminary.

He also served as adjunct professor at the Pacific School of Religion in San Francisco.

"Gottwald's greatest contribution to biblical scholarship is his use of anthropology and sociology in biblical studies."

Gottwald was an ordained minister of American Baptist Churches USA and as such "...a strong advocate of popular biblical study committed to social change."

Fellowships, grants, honors, awards
 1960:  Faculty Research Scholarship from the American Association of Theological Schools
 1960:  Fulbright Research Scholarship at Hebrew University (Jerusalem)
 1968:  Post-Doctorate Fellowship at Hebrew Union College Biblical and Archaeological School (Jerusalem)
 1970:  Faculty Research Scholarship from the American Association of Theological Schools
 1996:  Honorary Doctorate from the University of Sheffield

Students
 Claude Mariottini, professor of Old Testament, Northern Baptist Seminary

Personal life
Gottwald was born on October 27, 1926, in Chicago to Norman Karl and Carol (Copeland) Gottwald.

Gottwald married Laura; they had two children.

In 1953, Gottwald wrote a letter to Life magazine in response to the essay "Is Academic Freedom in Danger?" by Whittaker Chambers, stating:  Sirs:Mr. Chambers' article is timely and soberly written.  We must all be thanks for his contribution.  But with all their grim necessity, such investigations arouse and feed upon suspicion and mistrust; they inflame passion and prejudice.  A little more "liberal neurosis" in Germany might have checked Nazism at its inception.  The liberal must warn that in the struggle for survival we may sell our soul.Certainly, we must uncover and prosecute those who intend the violent overthrow of our government.  But we must resist with all our strength the self-righteousness and assumed importance, the political opportunism of those who would have us believe these skirmishes constitute the real war against Communism.  The "liberal neurosis" is trying to lift the vision of shortsighted men who have little or no understanding of the conflict of ideas, of why men become Communists, why they are disillusioned, and how we may enlist these factors in the cause of freedom.Norman K. Gottwald  New York, NY Gottwald's was the final letter published by the magazine and seemed to make the most effort to resolve conflicting views in the foregoing letters. Gottwald died March 11, 2022  .

Works
Gottwald's most influential work is The Tribes of Yahweh: A Sociology of the Religion of Liberated Israel, 1250-1050 B.C.E. (1979). In it, he employed a sociological approach to the study of  early Israelite religion and politics. He proposed Israelites emerged as local Canaanite peasants sought to overthrow the corrupt regimes they lived in. Their action was fueled by a liberating faith in the deity Yahweh. They dislocated to the previously unsettled Judean hills in order to form a more equal community. These ideals are reflected in the legendary stories of the Pentateuch, Joshua and Judges.

Authored books
Studies in the Book of Lamentations. Studies in Biblical Theology 14. London: SCM, 1954.  Reprinted, Eugene, OR: Wipf & Stock, 2010.   (orig. PhD Thesis, Columbia University, 1953)
A Light to the Nations: An Introduction to the Old Testament. New York: Harper, 1959. Reprinted, Eugene, OR: Wipf & Stock, 2009. 
All the Kingdoms of the Earth: Israelite Prophecy and International Relations in the Ancient Near East. New York: Harper & Row, 1964.  Reprinted, Minneapolis: Fortress, 2007. 
The Church Unbound: A Human Church in a Human World. Philadelphia: Lippincott, 1967. 
The Tribes of Yahweh: A Sociology of the Religion of Liberated Israel, 1250-1050 B.C.E.. Maryknoll, NY: Orbis, 1979.
The Hebrew Bible: A Socio-literary Introduction. Philadelphia: Fortress, 1985. 
The Hebrew Bible in Its Social World and in Ours. SBL Semeia Studies. Atlanta: Scholars, 1993. 
with Laura Lagerquist-Gottwald. Pentecost 3. Proclamation 6: Interpreting the Lessons of the Church Year. Series B. Minneapolis: Fortress, 1996. 
The Tribes of Yahweh: A Sociology of the Religion of Liberated Israel, 1250-1050 B.C.E.. Reprinted, with a new Preface. Biblical Seminar 66. Sheffield: Sheffield Academic, 1999. 
The Politics of Ancient Israel. Library of Ancient Israel. Louisville: Westminster John Knox, 2001. 
The Hebrew Bible: A Brief Socio-literary Introduction. Philadelphia: Fortress, 2008. 
Social Justice and the Hebrew Bible. Vol. 1. Center and Library for the Bible and Social Justice Series. Eugene, OR: Cascade Books, 2016.
Social Justice and the Hebrew Bible. Vol. 2. Center and Library for the Bible and Social Justice Series. Eugene, OR: Cascade Books, 2016.
Social Justice and the Hebrew Bible. Vol. 3. Center and Library for the Bible and Social Justice Series. Eugene, OR: Cascade Books, 2018.

Edited books
 Gottwald, Norman K., ed. The Bible and Liberation: Political and Social Hermeneutics. Maryknoll, NY: Orbis, 1983. 
 Gottwald, Norman K., and Richard A. Horsley, eds. The Bible and Liberation: Political and Social Hermeneutics. Rev. ed. Bible and Liberation Series. Maryknoll, NY: Orbis, 1993. 
 Coote, Robert B., and Norman K. Gottwald, eds. To Break Every Yoke: Essays in Honor of Marvin L. Chaney. Social World of Biblical Antiquity, 2nd ser., 3. Sheffield: Sheffield Phoenix, 2007.

Festschriften
 Jobling, David, Peggy L. Day, and Gerald T. Sheppard, eds. The Bible and the Politics of Exegesis: Essays in Honor of Norman K. Gottwald on His Sixty-fifth Birthday. Cleveland: Pilgrim, 1991. 
 Boer, Roland, ed. Tracking the Tribes of Yahweh: On the Trail of a Classic. Journal for the Study of the Old Testament Supplements 351. London: Sheffield Academic, 2002.

See also
George E. Mendenhall

References

External links

1926 births
2022 deaths
American biblical scholars
Old Testament scholars
University of California, Berkeley faculty
Activists from Chicago